The Club de la Unión is a non-profit Peruvian civil association which was founded on October 10, 1868. Its founders include such notable historical figures such as admiral Miguel Grau, colonel Alfonso Ugarte, and colonel Francisco Bolognesi, many of which would later go on to serve in the Peruvian military during the War of the Pacific.

Infrastructure
Currently, the Club de la Unión is headquartered in the heart of the Historic center of Lima on the Plaza Mayor. Its offices occupy the Palacio de la Unión which is located at the intersection of the Jirón de la Unión and the Jiron Huallaga. 

The Palacio de la Unión was inaugurated in 1942 and is considered a Monument of National Heritage by the National Institute of Culture and along with the Government Palace, Cathedral of Lima, Archbishop's Palace and the Municipal Palace of Lima forms the Plaza Mayor of Lima. 

The club also maintains a beach headquarters in the Santa Rosa District which also serves as a sports complex.

See also
Balconies of Lima
Historic center of Lima
Plaza Mayor of Lima
Lima

References
Official Website of the Club de la Unión

Buildings and structures in Lima
Palaces in Peru
Spanish Revival architecture
Tourist attractions in Lima